Brett Spencer Garrard (born 21 August 1976) is a British former field hockey player. Garrard competed in the 2000 Summer Olympics and in the 2004 Summer Olympics. He represented England and won a bronze medal in the men's hockey, at the 1998 Commonwealth Games in Kuala Lumpur. He also competed at both the 2002 and 2006 Commonwealth Games.

References

External links

 

1976 births
Living people
British male field hockey players
Olympic field hockey players of Great Britain
Field hockey players at the 2000 Summer Olympics
Field hockey players at the 2004 Summer Olympics
Commonwealth Games medallists in field hockey
Commonwealth Games bronze medallists for England
1998 Men's Hockey World Cup players
2002 Men's Hockey World Cup players
2006 Men's Hockey World Cup players
Surbiton Hockey Club players
HC Klein Zwitserland players
Field hockey players at the 1998 Commonwealth Games
Field hockey players at the 2002 Commonwealth Games
Field hockey players at the 2006 Commonwealth Games
Medallists at the 1998 Commonwealth Games